Anderson & Hester is a mathematical system for ranking collegiate American football teams based on performance. The system was created in 1992 by Jeff Anderson and Chris Hester, roommates at the University of Washington. Anderson & Hester is one of over 40 systems listed by the NCAA as major selectors of college football national champions. The rankings are published weekly in The Seattle Times.

National champions
Anderson & Hester selections from the 1997 season to present.

References

External links
 

College football championships
College football awards organizations